Atsinanana is a coastal region in eastern Madagascar. It borders Analanjirofo region in the north, Alaotra-Mangoro in the west, Vakinankaratra and Amoron'i Mania in the southwest, and Vatovavy and Fitovinany in south. The region contains over 285km of coastline, which includes many beaches and cultural heritage sites.

Atsinanana is known for its fish breeding and fishing near its ports, ore claims and mining activity, as well as its agriculture.

The capital of the region is Toamasina, and the population was 1,484,403 in 2018.

The current governor of Atsinanana is Richard Théodore Rafidison.

Administrative divisions
Atsinanana Region is divided into seven districts, which are sub-divided into 82 communes.

 Antanambao Manampotsy District - 5 communes
 Mahanoro District - 11 communes
 Marolambo District - 12 communes
 Toamasina I District - 1 commune
 Toamasina II District - 15 communes
 Vatomandry District - 14 communes
 Vohibinany District - 17 communes; a.k.a. Brickaville; a.k.a. Ampasimanolotra

Transport

Airports
Ilaka-Atsinanana Airport
Mahanoro Airport
Toamasina Airport
Vatomandry Airport

Protected areas
Sahafina New Protected Area
Part of Ankeniheny-Zahamena Corridor
Nosivolo river
Analalava Special Reserve
Betampona Reserve
Part of Zahamena National Park
Mangerivola Reserve
Part of Marolambo National Park

References

 
Regions of Madagascar